The Coalition Against Genocide is a coalition of about 40 organisations mostly based in the United States and Canada, as well as individuals, who aim to respond to the 2002 Gujarat riots, which they refer to as the "Gujarat genocide", in order to "demand accountability and justice."  The coalition of organisations protested against the visit of Narendra Modi, the Chief Minister of Gujarat, to the United States in March 2005. Modi was denied a visa and did not visit the U.S. at that time.

History
Angana Chatterji helped form and worked with the Coalition Against Genocide. The Coalition was subject to much public targeting after some incriminating documents and an anti-Chatterji online petition to the President and Board of Trustees of CIIS appeared.

In July 2008, the coalition again protested against another visit by Modi to the United States, claiming that "the conditions under which he was denied a visa in 2005 remain largely unchanged and the minority community in the state continues to face human rights violations. Modi was again denied a visa by the United States State Department.

Shaikh Ubaid was another founding member of Coalition Against Genocide. Ubaid has formed a new activist group named Alliance for Justice and Accountability (AJA), which he says comprises "most organizations and individuals who were part of Coalition Against Genocide (CAG)".

Coalition members
The coalition claims the following members:

References

External links 
 Coalition Against Genocide (official website)

International human rights organizations
2002 Gujarat riots